Glyphidocera capraria is a moth in the family Autostichidae. It was described by Edward Meyrick in 1929. It is found in Colombia.

References

Moths described in 1929
Glyphidocerinae